Ramachandran Unnithan; born 21 January 1936), popularly known as R. C. Unnithan or simply R.C., was a Malayalam political activist and trade union leader. he was one of the early leaders of the Communist Party of India in the southern districts and eastern plantations of Kerala, India.

He contested on CPI(M) party tickets for the state legislative election in 1965 from Adoor constituency and from the nearby Konni constituency in 1970 and 1977. He was a political prisoner at the state prison along with several leading opposition leaders  who were imprisoned in Kerala and  elsewhere all across India during the Emergency regime when fundamental democratic rights were curtailed for twenty-one months between 1975 and 1977.

He published several books and articles. Notable among them was a personal/political diary penned while being imprisoned during emergency years.

References

1936 births
2015 deaths
People from Pathanamthitta district
Writers from Kerala
Trade unionists from Kerala
Communist Party of India (Marxist) politicians from Kerala
Malayali politicians
Malayalam-language writers
Malayalam poets
University College Thiruvananthapuram alumni
Indians imprisoned during the Emergency (India)
The Emergency (India)